The  Le Maschere del Teatro Italiano (The Masks of Italian Theatre), more commonly known informally as the Le Maschere Award in Italian Le Maschere, recognizes achievement in live Italian theatre is the national theatre award of Italy. The awards are presented and decided by the Ente Teatrale Italiano (ETI) and supported by the Italian Ministry of Culture at an annual ceremony in Naples. The awards are given for Italian productions and performances.

The Le Maschere Awards are considered the highest Italy theatre honor, the Italy theatre industry's equivalent to the American Tony Award in live productions in the US, the Molière Award in France or the Olivier Award for theatre in UK..

History 

Created in 2003 by desire of the ETI, the Teatro Stabile del Veneto and Italian Ministry of Culture in collaboration with the Veneto region and the town of Vicenza, this annual award marks the boundary between the season theatrical ended and that we are going to open. Set as the Oscars of the cinema, the awards are divided into categories, each of which has a set of three finalists (the nomination) selected by a committee of experts (artists, critics and institutional personalities with President outside the world of entertainment). The winner will be chosen by a jury composed of 300 artists and professionals in the Italian theater.
The first phase of the prize (the creation of the nomination) takes place in Rome at the headquarters of the ETI. The artists of backhoe loaders are also received in the Quirinal by the President of the Republic . The second phase will be held in Venice, at the headquarters of the Teatro Stabile del Veneto.

Ceremonies 

The awards ceremony takes place generally in September in the Teatro Olimpico in Vicenza (hence the name of the prize).
Since the first edition of the ceremony was presented by Tullio Solenghi and deferred broadcast live on Rai Uno. The 2009 edition saw instead in the role of conductor Massimo Ranieri.

Since 2011, the Napoli Teatro Festival organizes the award too, in collaboration with the AGIS (Association of Italian General Entertainment), renewing the tradition of the Premio Eti - The Olympic Theatre. Prizes are awarded in the frame of the Teatro San Carlo in Naples.

2003-2004 
Ceremony held on Saturday, October 2.
Best show of prose: The Miser, directed by Gabriele Lavia
Best musical or comedy music: The singing of the shepherds directed by Barra, Memoli and Cannavacciuolo
Best show of innovation: Fairy Tales of Oscar Wilde, directed by Giancarlo Sepe
Best Actor: Roberto Herlitzka for let me go mother and the exhibition
Best Actress: Maria Paiato for Dear Professor and The Memoirs of water
Best Supporting Actor: Valerio Binasco for Oedipus at Colonus
Best Supporting Actress: Franca Valeri for the gamester
Best Actor / Actress: Fausto Russo Alesi for The gray ex aequo with Gaia Aprea for Georges Dandin, Memories and Iphigenia in Tauris
Best interpreter of monologue or "One Man Show": Adriana Asti to Tell and Nott - Stramilano
Best Director: Gabriele Lavia for The Miser
Best Director: Maurizio Balò for When you are someone and Tonight we improvise
Best Costume: Silvia Polidori for The Visit of the Old Lady
Best author of music: Arturo Annechino for Volpone, Tonight we improvise and when someone is
Best Italian author of novelty: Beppe Lanzetta and Vincenzo Pirrotta for Malaluna

2005  
Awards Ceremony held on Friday 30 September.
Best show of prose: Professor Bernhardi directed by Luca Ronconi
Best musical or comedy music: Concha Bonita directed by Alfredo Arias
Best show of innovation: Scream directed by Pippo Delbono
Best Actor: Massimo De Francovich for Professor Bernhardi and Paolo Borsellino State being
Best Actress: Mariangela Spalato for Who's Afraid of Virginia Woolf and the centaur
Best Supporting Actor: Paolo Graziosi for Six Characters in Search of an Author
Best Supporting Actress: Anita Bartolucci for Well-being
Best Actor / Actress: Marco Foschi for Trilogy Paolini, Edward II and Romeo and Juliet ex aequo with Antonia Truppo for Six Characters in Search of an Author
Best interpreter of monologue or "One Man Show": Giancarlo Condè for the king's jester Rigoletto ex aequo with Ottavia Piccolo for Land of milk and honey
Best Director: Luca Ronconi for Professor Bernhardi and the centaur
Best Director: Margherita Palli for Professor Bernhardi and the centaur
Best Costume: Gabriele Mayer for The centaur
Best author of music: Germano Mazzocchetti for Memories, a snack General, King Lear, Alcestis and The Persians
Best Italian author of novelty: Davide Enia for Scanna, May '43 and Brazil 3 Italy 2
Special Prize of the President of the Commission for Nominations: Armando Trovajoli

2006 
Awards Ceremony held on Friday 15 September.
Best show of prose: Death of a Salesman, directed by Marco Sciaccaluga
Best musical or comedy musical The Producers directed by Saverio Marconi
Best show of innovation: Other happy days directed by Claudio Remondi and Riccardo Caporossi
Best Actor: Eros Pagni for Death of a Salesman
Best Actress: Giulia Lazzarini for more happy days
Best Supporting Actor: Ugo Maria Morosi for Death of a Salesman
Best Supporting Actress: Sara Bertelà for The illusion comic
Best Actor / Actress: Federica Di Martino for The shape of things
Best interpreter of monologue or "One Man Show": Paola Cortellesi for The last shall be last
Best Director: Marco Sciaccaluga for Death of a Salesman
Best Director: Emanuele Luzzati for The Bridge of San Louis Ray
Best Costume: Odette Nicoletti for The vindictive woman
Best author of music: Ramberto Ciammarughi for Feast of the Lord of the Ship
Best author of novelty Italian: Vittorio Franceschi for Daphne's smile
Special Prize of the President of the Commission for Nominations: Rossella Falk

2007 
Awards Ceremony held on Friday 14 September.
Best show of prose: The longings for vacationing directed by Elena Bucci
Best musical or comedy musical Chateder directed by Armando Pugliese
Best show of innovation: Rome 11 am directed by Mandracchia, Real, Toffolatti, Torres
Best Actor: Paolo Poli for you brilliant
Best Actress: Ottavia Piccolo for Trial of God
Best Supporting Actor: Massimo Verdastro for Birds
Best Supporting Actress: Anna Bonaiuto to invent it out of whole cloth
Best Actor / Actress: Francesco Bonomo for Measure for Measure ex aequo with Federica Fracassi for The Orphan Muses
Best interpreter of monologue or "One Man Show" Maria Paiato for A simple heart
Best Director: Pier Luigi Pizzi for one of the last evenings of Carnival
Best Director: Enrico Job for entries in
Best Costume: Silvia Polidori for Chateder
Best author of music: Enzo Gragnianiello for Chateder
Best author of novelty Italian: Edoardo Erba for Margherita and the cock
Special Prize of the President of the Commission for Nominations: Carlo Giuffré

2008 
Awards Ceremony on Wednesday, September 10.
 Best show of prose: Angels in America, directed by Ferdinando Bruni and Elio De Capitani
 Best musical or comedy music: There we darem hand directed by Roberto De Simone
 Best show of innovation: ' Nzularchia directed by Carlo Cerciello
 Best Actor: Massimo Popolizio for Ritter, Dene, Voss
 Best Actress: Mascia Musy for Anna Karenina
 Best Supporting Actor: Gigio Morra for Holiday Trilogy
 Best Supporting Actress: Leda Negroni for Elettra
 Best Actor / Actress: Anna Della Rosa for Holiday Trilogy
 Best interpreter of monologue or "One Man Show": Roberto Herlitzka for Ex Hamlet eD Oedipus at Colonus
 Best Director: Ferdinando Bruni and Elio De Capitani for Angels in America
 Best Director: Roberto Crea for ' Nzularchia
 Best Costume: Franca Squarciapino for the family of the antiquarian
 Best author of music: Antonio Di Pofi for fasting is prohibited on the beach, the family of the antiquarian and The Merchant of Venice
 Best of novelty Italian author: Roberto Saviano and Mario Gelardi for Gomorrah
 Special Prize of the President of the Commission for Nominations: Anna Proclemer

2009 
Awards Ceremony held on Friday September 11.
 Best show of prose: Dream of a Midsummer Night directed by Luca Ronconi
 Best Musical or Comedy Musical: The Road directed by Marco Venturiello
 Best show of innovation: Chiove directed by Francesco Saporito
 Best Actor: Alessandro Gassman for Angry Men
 Best Actress: Giuliana Lojodice for conversations of Anna K.
 Best Supporting Actor: Gennaro Cannavacciuolo to always tell him yes
 Best Supporting Actress: Anita Bartolucci for Oedipus
 Best Actor / Actress: Valentina Capone for Sun, the dream of Giruziello
 Best interpreter of monologue or "One Man Show": Roberto Battiston for Orson Well's Rost
 Best Director: Carmelo Rifici for Chie Chan and The suitors
 Best Director: Graziano Gregori for Pinocchio
 Best Costume: Sabrina Chiocchio for the road
 Best author of music: Germano Mazocchetti for the road work and women informed about the facts
 Best of novelty Italian author: Andrea Camilleri - Giuseppe Dipasquale for The brewer of Preston
 Special Prize of the President of the Commission for Nominations: Franca Valeri

2011 
 Best show of prose: The giants of the mountain, directed by Enzo Vetrano and Stefano Randisi
 Best Director: Giancarlo Sepe for Bite of the new moon
 Best Actor: Ugo Pagliai for Waiting for Godot
 Best Actress: Mariangela Spalato for Nora to the test
 Best Supporting Actor: Filippo Dini for Romeo and Juliet
 Best Supporting Actress: Giulia Lazzarini for Donna Rosita maiden
 Best Actor / Actress: Massimo De Matteo for Lies with long legs
 Best interpreter of monologue: Fabrizio Gifuni for Engineer Gadda goes to war
 Best Director: Maurizio Balò for Andromache
 Best Costume: Santuzza Cali for The sea
 Best author of music: Antonio Di Pofi for Andromache
 Best of novelty Italian author: Luca De Bei for the mornings ten to four
 Special award to the memory of Graziella Lonardi Bontempi: Claudio Gubitosi
 Special Prize of the President: Massimo Ranieri

2012 
 Best show of prose: The Coast of Utopia, directed by Marco Tullio Giordana
 Best Director: Elio De Capitani, Ferdinando Bruni for The History Boys
 Best Actor: Luigi Lo Cascio for Diceria dell'untore
 Best Actress: Laura Marinoni for A Streetcar Named Desire
 Best Supporting Actor: Ugo Maria Morosi for The Threepenny Opera
 Best Supporting Actress: Elisabetta Valgoi for A Streetcar Named Desire
 Best Actor / Actress: Filippo Nigro for West solitary
 Best interpreter of monologue: Anna Maria Guarnieri for Eleanor, last night in Pittsburgh
 Best Director: Alessandro Camera for Everything for good
 Best Costume: Francesca Sartori, Elizabeth Old for The Coast of Utopia
 Best author of music: Germano Mazzocchetti for The Merry Wives of Windsor
 Best author of novelty Italian: Vincenzo Pirrotta for Diceria dell'untore
 Special award to the memory of Graziella Lonardi Bontempi: Claudio Gubitosi
 Special Prize of the President: Massimo Ranieri

2013 
 Best show of prose: The voices within, directed by Toni Servillo
 Best Director: Toni Servillo for entries in
 Best Actor: Toni Servillo for entries in
 Best Actress: Sara Bertelà for Exit
 Best Supporting Actor: Peppe Servillo for entries in
 Best Supporting Actress: Chiara Baffi for entries in
 Best interpreter of monologue: Michela Cescon for Leonilde, great story of an ordinary woman
 Best Director: Simone Mannino for There's crying in these tears
 Best Costume: Simona D'Amico for There's crying in these tears
 Best author of music: Nicola Piovani for the evening Settler
 Best Italian author of novelty: Valeria Parrella for Antigone
 Special award to the memory of Graziella Lonardi Bontempi: National Institute of Ancient Drama
 Special Prize of the President: Eros Pagni

External links
Le Maschere Awards Official Site {it}

Italian theatre awards
Italian awards
Awards established in 2003
2003 establishments in Italy